Art Production Fund (APF) is a non-profit organization under section 501(c)(3) of the U.S. tax code that presents public art throughout the United States. It was founded in 2000 by Yvonne Force Villareal and Doreen Remen.  it is directed by Casey Fremont.

Public projects 
This is a select list of public art projects by APF.
Fatimah Tuggar, "Changing Space," New York, New York, 2002
Elmgreen & Dragset, “Prada Marfa,” Valentine, Texas, 2005–ongoing 
Rudolf Stingel, "Plan B," Grand Central Station, New York City, 2004
Tim Noble and Sue Webster, "Electric Fountain," Rockefeller Center, New York City, 2008
David Brooks, Josephine Meckseper, Kiki Smith, "The Last Lot," New York City, 2011–2012
FriendsWithYou, "Light Cave," New York City, 2014
Ugo Rondinone, “Seven Magic Mountains,” Las Vegas, 2016–ongoing
Jeff Koons, “Seated Ballerina,” Rockefeller Center, New York City, 2017
Zoe Buckman, “CHAMP,” LA, 2018–ongoing
Raul de Nieves, “When I Look In To Your Eyes I See the Sun,” Miami, 2018–2019
Lucy Sparrow, “Lucy’s Delicatessen on 6th,” Rockefeller Center, New York City, 2019
Nancy Baker Cahill, “Liberty Bell”, Selma, Alabama; Charleston, South Carolina; Washington D.C.; Philadelphia, Pennsylvania; Rockaway, New York; Boston, Massachusetts, 2020

References

External links
Art Production Fund website

Arts organizations based in New York City
Arts organizations established in 2000